The Chicago Griffins RFC rugby union team was founded in 1973. The team competes in the National Division I Midwest League, USA Rugby's top tier, after the demise of the USA Super League and play their home games at Riis Park in Chicago, Illinois, US.

History 
The Chicago Griffins was founded in 1973 by the late Bob "Doc" Kelly along with Brian Bourke, Mike Elliot, John Carmody, Rick Grigutis, and Tom Powers. The Griffins would not exist today had it not been for these players.

Sponsorship 
Notable primary sponsors include Founders Brewery, Wells Street Crossfit, Edgewater Athletic Club, Athletico Physical Therapy, Black Rock Pub, Belvedere Trading, Torrey and Gray, USA Voice and Data and Arcoa.

2015/16 season 

The Chicago Griffins finished fourth in the regular season but beat top seeds the Chicago Lions in the semi finals of the Midwest Championship. The Griffins lost the Midwest Championship final by two points to Metropolis 29–27.

In finishing Runners Up the club qualified for the 2016/17 Gold Cup, a competition played between some of USA Rugby's elite rugby clubs, including current National Champions Mystic River, National Champion Runners Up the Austin Blacks and National Championship Final 8 teams Dallas reds, Rocky Gorge and Metropolis..

Midwest League National Division 1 2015-16 season 

4 Points awarded to the winning team
0 Points to the losing team
2 Points to each team in the case of a tie
1 Bonus Point to a team scoring 4 or more tries
1 Bonus Point to a losing team keeping the score within 7 points
Top 4 advance to playoffs
Midwest Champion Advances to USA National Championships Final 8

Rugby 7s

Men's 
The Chicago Griffins Men's Sevens yearly participate in the Midwest Men's 7s national qualifiers.

Women's 

In 2016 the Chicago Griffin's formed their first Women's Sevens team. The team was an instant success, winning both the Iowa City Ducks' Sevens tournament, the Grand Rapids Hard Rock Sevens tournament, and the Midwest Sevens Championship.

In doing so the team won one of 16 places in the 2016 Club Sevens National Championship held in Denver in August 2016. The Chicago Griffins Women's Sevens team won the Shield trophy at the National Championship tournament in Denver.

(In the photo, starting from the left: Top- Cydney Grannon, Kadie Sanford, Rafika Faci, Jess Dombrowksi, Linda Guiner, Christy Bravo, Kayla Enriquez. Bottom-Lauren Trout, Brittany Klimek, Lizzy Bristow, Brittany Biedenbender, Amanda Graziano)

Current 1st XV squad

References

Newspaper articles

External links 
 

Griffins
Rugby clubs established in 1973
1973 establishments in Illinois